Moral idiocy is an inability to distinguish between right and wrong, or to understand how moral values apply to ones own life and the lives of others.  

The term is sometimes used to describe amoral institutional behavior, with the suggestion that moral idiocy may be an ingrained feature of some social, commercial, and/or political constructs.

In Psychopathology

In Social Analysis

In Literature and the Arts

References
 
 
 
 Brim, J. A., & Nelson, J. M. (1981). Moral idiocy: A new look at an old concept. Corrective & Social Psychiatry & Journal of Behavior Technology, Methods & Therapy, 27(4), 167–169. 

Moral psychology
Ethics